Viktors Dobrecovs (born 9 January 1977) is a football manager and former Latvian football striker.

Honours
Virsliga Top Scorer (4):
 1998, 1999, 2003, 2005

References

 

1977 births
Living people
Sportspeople from Liepāja
Latvian footballers
Latvian football managers
Latvian Higher League players
FK Liepājas Metalurgs players
FC TVMK players
Latvia international footballers
FC Daugava players
Expatriate footballers in Estonia
Latvian expatriate footballers
Latvian expatriate sportspeople in Estonia
Association football forwards